This is a comprehensive list of songs by English rock band Kasabian. Since forming in 1999, the band have released six studio albums, two live albums and two extended plays (EPs). This list does not contain live versions or remixes released by the band.

Original songs

Cover songs

Kasabian
 
Kasabian